The 2020–21 Iraq FA Cup was the 31st edition of the Iraqi knockout football cup as a clubs-only competition, the main domestic cup in Iraqi football, featuring 126 teams (20 from the Iraqi Premier League and 106 from the Iraq Division One and Iraq Division Two). It started on 20 October 2020 and the final was played on 19 July 2021 at Al-Shaab Stadium in Baghdad.

The winners of the competition were Al-Quwa Al-Jawiya, who won their fifth title with a penalty shootout victory over Al-Zawraa, becoming the first Iraqi club to win the double since the 2001–02 season.

Schedule 
The rounds of the 2020–21 competition were scheduled as follows:

First round 
Al-Tijara, Al-Atheer, Jisr Diyala, Al-Baiyaa, Al-Kadhimiya, Al-Nasr wal-Salam, Al-Najda, Al-Ghadhriya, Qalat Saleh, Ahrar Maysan and Al-Sumoud received byes to the second round.
Baghdad Section

Southern and Central Euphrates Section

Western Section

Northern Section

Second round 
Al-Taliea, Al-Musayyib, Masafi Al-Wasat, Jabla, Jenaain Babil, Al-Suwaira, Al-Noor and Baladiyat Al-Mosul received byes to the third round.
Baghdad Section

Southern and Central Euphrates Section

Western Section

Northern Section

Third round 
Haifa and Al-Amwaj Al-Mosuli received byes to the fourth round.
Baghdad Section

Southern and Central Euphrates Section

Western Section

Northern Section

Fourth round 
Al-Jamahir, Al-Jolan, Shahraban, Al-Khalis, Newroz and Al-Shirqat received byes to the Round of 32.
Baghdad Section

Southern and Central Euphrates Section

Northern Section

Final phase

Bracket

Round of 32 
20 top-tier teams and 12 lower-tier teams competed in this round.

Round of 16 
14 top-tier teams and 2 lower-tier teams competed in this round.

Quarter-finals 
All remaining teams are from the top-tier.

Semi-finals

Final

References

External links
 Iraq Football Association

 
Iraq
Cup